The Leadership Forum (previously the World Leadership Forum, Ltd.) was a non-governmental organisation devoted to the development of leadership in a number of key areas including communication, education and policy, that operated from October 2000 to October 2008, or until sometime in 2009-2010.

Organization and history

From 1996 to 2009-2010, the World Leadership Forum, Ltd., or Leadership Forum, Ltd. of London, England, UK—last under the leadership of publishing executive Malcolm Turner,—achieved international attention for organizing various awards and their presentation events, in a variety of high-profile, high-influence fields (which could attract large donors/sponsors).  The organization partnered with various high-reputation individuals and institutions (particularly in the U.K., Europe and the United States), on various awards programs, in various years.

The organization incorporated as the "World Leadership Forum, Ltd." (or "...Limited") ("limited liability" organization) under British law in October 2000. It is listed as "struck off and dissolved" on May 19, 2009.

The organization's many awards programs—which apparently started in 1996, and peaked around 2005-2007—vanished around 2010.  Subsequently, some appear to have re-emerged (sometimes under other names) under the auspices of various other organizations, in various places.

Many prominent cities, leaders and professionals cite these awards on their official or personal websites and other documents.

Awards programs

Major awards programs of the World Leadership Forum, Ltd. included:

 World Leadership Awards
 Policymaker of the Year Awards
 Commentator of the Year Awards
 Business Leader of the Year Awards
 Business Journalist of the Year Awards
 Aerospace Journalist of the Year Awards (AJOYA)
 Science, Engineering & Technology (SET) Student of the Year Awards

Initially, the WLF's awards were chiefly the object of competition among British people, but widened over time to include Western Europeans and English-speaking nations (chiefly the United States); and then gradually expanded to encompass a fairly global range of candidates and award winners.  Greatest participation and notoriety occurred around 2006, by most online indications.

Incomplete list of winners of the various World Leadership Forum awards:

 World Leadership Awards
- category: Architecture & Civil Engineering
- category: Culture & the Arts
- category: Housing
- category: Economy &/or Employment
- category: Environment
 2006 - Salt Lake City, Utah, USA

- category: Law & Order

- category: Urban Renewal
 2005 - Phnom Penh, Cambodia
 2006 - St. Louis, Missouri, USA
 - Other Shortlist finalists for 2006:
 * Kansas City, Missouri, USA
 * Manchester, England, UK
 * Calcutta, India

- category: Transport

- category: Utilities / Water / Conservation
 2006 - Albuquerque, New Mexico, USA (mayor: Martin Chávez)

 Policymaker of the Year Awards
 2007 - Senator John McCain, United States

 Business Leader of the Year Awards
 2006 - Stuart Rose
 2006 - Niklas Zennström

 Commentator of the Year Awards
 2006 - Alex Brummer

 Business Journalist of the Year Awards
 twice - Liam Halligan
 2004 - Catherine Arnst
 2005 - Ann Davis
 2006 - Alex Brummer

 Aerospace Journalist of the Year Awards (AJOYA)
 For a complete listing of the AJOYA winners, (but not the Shortlist finalists), see the Wikipedia page for the Aerospace Journalist of the Year Awards.

References 

International organisations based in London